Scantic River State Park is a public recreation area consisting of several separated parcels totaling  along the Scantic River in the towns of Enfield, East Windsor, and Somers, Connecticut. The state park is suitable for hiking, fishing, and hunting and is managed by the Connecticut Department of Energy and Environmental Protection.

History
The park was first planned in 1967 with the state legislature approving the plans the following year. A master plan was made public in 1989, after which the first state purchases of land for the park began. The state intends to purchase ; as of 2014,  had been acquired.

Hunting

References

External links
Scantic River State Park Connecticut Department of Energy and Environmental Protection
Scantic River Linear Park Map: Enfield & Somers Connecticut Department of Energy and Environmental Protection
Scantic River Linear Park Map: Enfield Connecticut Department of Energy and Environmental Protection
Scantic River Linear Park Map: East Windsor Connecticut Department of Energy and Environmental Protection

State parks of Connecticut
Parks in Hartford County, Connecticut
Protected areas established in 1967
East Windsor, Connecticut
Enfield, Connecticut
Somers, Connecticut